Rays Hill Tunnel is one of three original Pennsylvania Turnpike tunnels which were abandoned (this one in 1968) after two massive realignment projects. The others included the Sideling Hill Tunnel, and farther west, the Laurel Hill Tunnel.

It was the shortest of the seven original tunnels on Pennsylvania Turnpike. Due to its short length, it only contains ventilation fans at its western portal. Its eastern portal is the only one of the 14 tunnel portals on the original turnpike that has no ventilation fan housing. It can be seen by westbound traffic on the Turnpike.

The tunnel connects Bedford and Fulton Counties in South Central Pennsylvania.

Tunnel Bypass

From the Turnpike's opening in 1940 until the realignment projects, the tunnels were bottlenecks due to reduced speeds with opposing traffic in the same tubes.

Four other tunnels on the Turnpike - Allegheny Mountain, Tuscarora Mountain, Kittatinny Mountain, and Blue Mountain - each had a second tube bored, as it was determined in these instances to be the less expensive option. 
All of the original tunnels were part of the never-completed South Pennsylvania Railroad which history has dubbed "Vanderbilt's Folly."

Current

At the present time, the tunnels remain unlit and unimproved since their closure in 1968. The entire length of the bypassed section is now commonly known as the Abandoned Pennsylvania Turnpike.

Notes

References

External links

Gribblenation's page about Rays Hill Tunnel
 More information about Rays Hill Tunnel

Transportation buildings and structures in Bedford County, Pennsylvania
Transportation buildings and structures in Fulton County, Pennsylvania
Pennsylvania Turnpike Commission
Former toll tunnels in the United States
Tunnels completed in 1940
Former toll roads in Pennsylvania
Road tunnels in Pennsylvania